Heerenveen is the main railway station in Heerenveen, Netherlands. The station opened on 15 January 1868 and is on the Arnhem–Leeuwarden railway. The services are operated by Nederlandse Spoorwegen.

Train services
, the following train services call at this station:
1× per hour express Intercity service: Rotterdam CS - Utrecht CS - Amersfoort CS - Zwolle - Leeuwarden (The first and last two IC's call at all stops after Zwolle)
1× per hour express Intercity service: The Hague CS - Leiden CS - Schiphol Airport - Amsterdam South - Almere Centrum - Lelystad Centrum - Zwolle - Leeuwarden (The first and last two IC's call at all stops after Zwolle)
1× per hour local Sprinter service: (Zwolle -) Meppel - Leeuwarden (On workingdays between 8 AM - 8 PM to Zwolle)

See also
 List of railway stations in Friesland

External links
NS website 
Dutch Public Transport journey planner 

Railway stations in Friesland
Railway stations opened in 1868
Railway stations on the Staatslijn A
Heerenveen